The Wineburgh Philatelic Research Library is part of the Eugene McDermott Library at the University of Texas at Dallas.

History 
The library was founded in 1976 by the late Harold Wineburgh and has its own endowment fund that supports its activities.

The collection 
Geographically the collection is strong in United States, British, Western European, and Mexican philatelic literature. It also has important collections of literature relating to forgeries, airmail, and state postal histories. Confederate postal history is also strong. 

Special collections include the official archive of the Texas Philatelic Association, Inc. between 1896 and 2006.

External links 
 
Finders guide to the records of the Texan Philatelic Association.

Philatelic libraries
1976 establishments in Texas